Varaki (also Romanized as Varakī) is a village in Tangeh Soleyman Rural District, Kolijan Rostaq District, Sari County, Mazandaran Province, Iran. At the 2006 census, its population was 378, in 148 families.

References 

Populated places in Sari County